North Eaton is an unincorporated community in Lorain County, in the U.S. state of Ohio.

History
The origin of the name North Eaton is obscure; the name may be a transfer from Eaton, New York. A post office called North Eaton was established in 1833, and remained in operation until 1928.

References

Unincorporated communities in Lorain County, Ohio
Unincorporated communities in Ohio